Sarah Maria Barraud (c.1823 – 8 March 1895) was a New Zealand homemaker and letter-writer. She was born in Wraysbury, Buckinghamshire, England, in about 1823.

References

1823 births
1895 deaths
Burials at Bolton Street Cemetery
English emigrants to New Zealand
19th-century New Zealand writers
19th-century New Zealand women writers